The Sultanate of Agadez (also known as Tenere Sultanate of Aïr, Sultanate of Aïr, or Asben) was a Berber kingdom centered in the city of Agadez in the Aïr Mountains, located at the southern edge of the Sahara desert in north-central Niger. It was founded in 1449 by the Tuareg and Hausa people as a trading post. The Agadez Sultanate was later conquered by the Songhai Empire in 1500. After the defeat of the Songhai kingdom in 1591, the Agadez Sultanate regained its independence. It experienced a steep decline in population and economic activity during the 17th century. The kingdom was later conquered by the French in 1900.

References

Further reading
Decalo, Samuel. Historical Dictionary of Niger, 3rd ed., pp. 24–27. Scarecrow Press (Boston), 1997. .
Hudgens, Jim & al. Rough Guide to West Africa, 4th ed., p. 983. Rough Guide, 2003. .

External links
 Louis Werner, Agadez: Sultanate of the Sahara, 2003, Saudi Aramco World

Sultanate Of Agadez
History of Niger
History of the Sahara
Countries in precolonial Africa
Berber dynasties
Former sultanates

ca:Aïr